Aitmatov is a Russianized Kyrgyz surname. Notable people with the surname include:

 Askar Aitmatov (born 1959), Kyrgyzstani politician, son of Chinghiz Aitmatov
 Chinghiz Aitmatov (1928–2008), Kyrgyzstani writer

Kyrgyz-language surnames